Alexandria Villaseñor (born 2005) is an American climate activist living in New York. A follower of the Fridays for Future movement and of fellow climate activist Greta Thunberg, Villaseñor is a co-founder of U.S. Youth Climate Strike and the founder of Earth Uprising.

Biography
Villaseñor was born in 2005 in Davis, California, where she grew up. The family moved from northern California to New York in 2018. Villaseñor is Latina. Her ambition is to work for the United Nations.

Activism
Villaseñor's fight for climate action was sparked when she was caught in a smoke cloud from the November 2018 Camp Fire in California during a family visit. As an asthma sufferer, she became physically ill, during which time she researched the climate change and temperature rises which contributed to the fire's severity. Her mother, Kristin Hogue, was enrolled in the M.A. in Climate and Society program at Columbia University and Villaseñor would occasionally attend class with her mother, where she learned about the underlying science of climate change. Soon afterward, she joined New York's chapter of Zero Hour, a group of American youth climate activists.

Villaseñor has taken similar climate action to Thunberg, who inspired her with her December 4, 2018 talk at the United Nations Climate Change Conference (COP24) in Katowice, Poland. Since December 14, 2018 (while COP24 was still held), she skips school every Friday in order to protest against lack of climate action in front of the Headquarters of the United Nations in New York. She is no longer involved with the US Youth Climate Strike group and founded the climate change education group Earth Uprising.

In May 2019, Villaseñor was the recipient of the Disruptor Award from the Tribeca Disruptive Innovation Awards (TDIA), received a scholarship from The Common Good public advocacy organization, and was awarded a Youth Climate Leadership prize from Earth Day Network.

When Thunberg arrived in New York City from her transatlantic sailboat voyage in August 2019, Villaseñor, Xiye Bastida, and other climate activists greeted Thunberg upon arrival. By that time, they had already established contact with each other over social media. 

On September 23, 2019, Villaseñor, along with 15 other youth activists including Greta Thunberg, Catarina Lorenzo, and Carl Smith, filed a legal complaint with the United Nations accusing five countries, namely France, Germany, Brazil, Argentina, and Turkey of failing to uphold their reduction targets to which they committed in their Paris Agreement pledges.

In mid-October 2019, she attended the C40 World Mayors Summit in Copenhagen, Denmark.

In mid-January 2020, she attended the World Economic Forum as a youth speaker and then participated in the School strike for climate in Davos, Switzerland alongside Greta Thunberg on January 24, 2020. 

On August 19, 2020, Alexandria addressed the Democratic National Convention as part of their segment on climate change. 

On December 1, 2020, she was named by Seventeen magazine as one of their 2020 Voices of the Year.

See also 
School Strike for Climate

References

External links

 
 
  earthuprising.org
  strikewithus.org home page for USA youth climate strike
 

Living people
2005 births
American environmentalists
Activists from New York City
Activists from California
21st-century American women
American climate activists
American child activists
American women environmentalists
Hispanic and Latino American people
People from Davis, California
Youth climate activists